Heterogeneous nuclear ribonucleoprotein A0 is a protein that in humans is encoded by the HNRNPA0 gene.

This gene belongs to the A/B subfamily of ubiquitously expressed heterogeneous nuclear ribonucleoproteins (hnRNPs). The hnRNPs are RNA binding proteins and they complex with heterogeneous nuclear RNA (hnRNA). These proteins are associated with pre-mRNAs in the nucleus and appear to influence pre-mRNA processing and other aspects of mRNA metabolism and transport. While all of the hnRNPs are present in the nucleus, some seem to shuttle between the nucleus and the cytoplasm. The hnRNP proteins have distinct nucleic acid binding properties. The protein encoded by this gene has two repeats of quasi-RRM domains that bind RNAs, followed by a glycine-rich C-terminus.

References

Further reading